The 1993 Tour de France was the 80th edition of Tour de France, one of cycling's Grand Tours. The Tour began in Le Puy du Fou with a prologue individual time trial on 3 July and Stage 10 occurred on 14 July with a mountainous stage to Serre Chevalier. The race finished on the Champs-Élysées in Paris on 25 July.

Prologue
3 July 1993 — Le Puy du Fou,  (ITT)

Stage 1
4 July 1993 — Luçon to Les Sables-d'Olonne,

Stage 2
5 July 1993 — Les Sables-d'Olonne to Vannes,

Stage 3
6 July 1993 — Vannes to Dinard,

Stage 4
7 July 1993 — Dinard to Avranches,  (TTT)

Stage 5
8 July 1993 — Avranches to Évreux,

Stage 6
9 July 1993 — Évreux to Amiens,

Stage 7
10 July 1993 — Péronne to Châlons-sur-Marne,

Stage 8
11 July 1993 — Châlons-sur-Marne to Verdun,

Stage 9
12 July 1993 — Lac de Madine,  (ITT)

Stage 10
14 July 1993 — Villard-de-Lans to Serre Chevalier,

Notes

References

1993 Tour de France
Tour de France stages